Peyser and Morrison Shirt Company Building is a historic industrial building located at Glens Falls, Warren County, New York.  It was built in 1893 and is a square, two story brick industrial structure with a highly embellished street facade in the Romanesque style.  It is the only extant industrial structure designed by prominent local architect Ephraim B. Potter (1855-1925).

It was added to the National Register of Historic Places in 1984.

References

Industrial buildings and structures on the National Register of Historic Places in New York (state)
Industrial buildings completed in 1893
Buildings and structures in Warren County, New York
National Register of Historic Places in Warren County, New York
Textile mills in New York (state)